August Marić (born 25 March 1885 in Goražde - died 17 November 1957) was a Croatian soldier. In the April War he commanded a division of the Royal Yugoslav Army. He was the first chief-of-staff of the Croatian Home Guard when it was created in May 1941, but was removed from his post and retired that September, probably because the Ustaše leadership did not trust him. He was succeeded as chief-of-staff by Vladimir Laxa. Together with minister Mladen Lorković, Marić signed the treaty establishing the border between the Independent State of Croatia and the German Reich.

He is buried in Mirogoj cemetery.

Notes

References
 

1885 births
1957 deaths
Austro-Hungarian military personnel of World War I
Royal Yugoslav Army personnel
Croatian people of World War II
Croatian Home Guard personnel
Croatian collaborators with Nazi Germany
Croatian collaborators with Fascist Italy
Burials at Mirogoj Cemetery